Porte is a comune (municipality) in the Metropolitan City of Turin in the Italian region Piedmont, located about  southwest of Turin.

Porte borders the following municipalities: Pinerolo, San Pietro Val Lemina, Villar Perosa, San Germano Chisone, and San Secondo di Pinerolo.

References

Cities and towns in Piedmont